Sergey Lobastov (5 April 1926 – 1999) was a Soviet racewalker. He competed in the men's 50 kilometres walk at the 1952 Summer Olympics.

References

External links

1926 births
1999 deaths
Athletes (track and field) at the 1952 Summer Olympics
Soviet male racewalkers
Olympic athletes of the Soviet Union